Jules Lion (c. 1809–1866) was a photographer born in Paris, who exhibited at the Paris Salon before emigrating to the United States in 1837. He eventually opened a daguerrotype studio in New Orleans in 1840, one year after the invention of the process. On March 14, 1840, the New Orleans Bee published a notice about an exhibition of Lion's daguerreotypes at the St. Charles Museum, the first documented photography exhibition in Louisiana.

From the 1970s until the early 21st century, Lion was thought to have been Black (he has been cited in exhibitions as the first African-American photographer,) but French census records consulted in 2017 point instead to his having been the son of German Jewish parents. The idea of his having been Black stems from several editions of a New Orleans city directory in the 1850s that include the letters "f.m.c." ("free man of color") next to his name. However, the lack of any race designator on legal documents and other records throughout his life, and his omission from significant early-20th-century histories of Louisiana free people of color (e.g., Nos Hommes et Notre Histoire, by Rodolphe Desdunes), suggests inaccuracy in the directories, possibly related to his having been in a relationship with a free woman of color at that time.

While Lion also painted, his main focus was a series of lithographed portraits of prominent Louisianans and people connected to Louisiana history, including John James Audubon and Andrew Jackson. Lion taught art at the Louisiana College and, late in his life, created lithographed Confederate sheet music covers.

References

External links

Bio & Works. Encyclopedia of Louisiana.
Jules Lion
Selections of nineteenth-century Afro-American Art, an exhibition catalog from The Metropolitan Museum of Art (fully available online as PDF), which contains material on Jules Lion

1809 births
1866 deaths
American photographers
Artists from New Orleans